is a Shinto-Ryukyuan-derived  religion founded by Takayasu Ryūsen (1934-) in Okinawa. This modern religion started in 1972 and in 1980 became registered under the Religious Corporations Law (Shūkyō Hōjinhō). In the same year, the movement joined the Shinshūren (Federation of Japanese New Religions) and started its overseas activities.

Ijun is based in traditional Okinawan animist and shamanistic beliefs related to noro (i.e. nuru, an Okinawan term for female diviners/priestesses) and yuta (an Okinawan term for shamans). This movement, emphasizes the worship of the deity Kinmanmon, an Okinawan god and cosmic deity and describes the mysterious life force of the universe as an "internal power" (uchinaa power) comparable to Japanese Universal Ki and teaches that people must awaken to this power. 

Ijun has most of its followers in Okinawa (Uchinaa), but it also has a temple in Yokohama and overseas temples in Taiwan and Hawaii.

References

 SHIMAMURA Takanori. "Okinawano shinshukyo ni okeru kyoso hosa no raifu hisutorii to reino-- 'Ijun' no jirei" [The life history and spiritual power of an assistant to the founder of a new religion in Okinawa: an example from the religion of 'Ijun'], Jinrui bunka 8 (Tsukuba Daigaku Rekishi Jinruigaku-kei Jinrui Bunka Kenkyukai).
 SHIMAMURA Takanori."'Ryukyu shinwa' no saisei: shinshukyo 'Ijun' no shinwa o megutte" (The rebirth of Okinawan myth: the mythos of the new religion of Ijun) (in Japanese), Kagoshima Tanki Daigaku Matsubara KenkyuShitsu, Amami Okinawa minkan bun gei kenkya 15 (July, 1992).
 Reichl, Christopher A. The Okinawan New Religion Ijun. Japanese Journal of Religious Studies 1993 20/4

External links
 Ijun  

Animism in Asia
Japanese new religions
Okinawa Prefecture
Shamanism in Japan